This is a partial list of RFCs (request for comments memoranda).

While there are over 9,150 RFCs as of February 2022, this list consists of RFCs that have related articles. A complete list is available from the IETF website.



Numerical list

Topical list
Obsolete RFCs are indicated with struck-through text.

References

External links 
 RFC-Editor - Document Retrieval - search engine
 RFC Database - contains various lists of RFCs
 RFC Bibliographic Listing - Listing of bibliographic entries for all RFCs. Also notes when an RFC has been made obsolete.

Internet Standards
 
Internet-related lists